Flight 106 may refer to:
 Civil Air Transport Flight 106, crashed on 20 June 1964
 Merpati Nusantara Airlines Flight 106, crashed on 19 April 1997

0106